Soon Hing v. Crowley, 113 U.S. 703 (1885), was a case decided by the Supreme Court of the United States.

Facts 
The plaintiff had been arrested by the defendant, the Chief of Police of the City and County of San Francisco, for an alleged violation of an ordinance of the board of supervisors of that municipality.  The ordinance prohibited the washing and ironing in public laundries and wash houses within defined territorial limits from ten o'clock at night to six in the morning.

The petition for the writ of habeas corpus set forth the arrest and detention of the petitioner by the chief of police, the ordinance under which the arrest was made, the complaint before the police judge, and the issue of the warrant under which he was taken into custody. It then proceeds to state that the petitioner had for several years been engaged in working for hire in a public laundry in the City and County of San Francisco, and complied with all the laws of the United States and of California and the ordinances of the city and county except in washing at the hours mentioned; that the business of carrying on a laundry is a lawful one, in which a large number of the subjects of the Emperor of China have been and are engaged in the said city and county within the limits prescribed by the ordinance; that there have been for several years great antipathy and hatred on the part of the residents of that city and county against the subjects of China residing and doing business there; that such antipathy and hatred have manifested themselves in various ways and under various forms for the purpose of compelling the subjects of China to quit and abandon their business and residence in the city and county and state; that owing to that feeling, and not otherwise, and not for any sanitary, police, or other legitimate purpose, but in order to force those subjects engaged in carrying on the business of a laundry in the City and County of San Francisco to abandon the exercise of their lawful vocation and their only means of livelihood, the supervisors passed the ordinance in question; that the petitioner has been and is earning his living exclusively by working at washing and ironing for hire, and in order to gain a livelihood is obliged to work late in the night, and has no other lawful vocation; that on the first of January 1884, his employer paid the license collector of the city and county six dollars, the amount required by the ordinance to obtain a license to carry on the business of a laundry, and obtained from him a license to carry on the business at a designated place within the prescribed limits. The petition also avers that section four of the ordinance is in contravention of the provisions of the Burlingame Treaty and of the Fourteenth Amendment to the Constitution of the United States in that it deprives them of the equal protection of the laws.

Issue before the court 
On hearing of the application for the writ, the judges of the circuit court were divided in opinion on several questions that arose. The questions were:

Whether section four of the ordinance mentioned is void on the ground that it is not within the police power of the Board of Supervisors of the City and County of San Francisco.
Whether said section is void on the ground that it discriminates between those engaged in the laundry business and those engaged in other classes of business.
Whether said section is void on the ground that it discriminates between the different classes of persons engaged in the laundry business.
Whether said section is void on the ground that it deprives a man of the right to labor at all times.
Whether said section is void on the ground that it is unreasonable in its requirements, in restraint of trade, or upon any other ground apparent upon the face of the ordinance, or appearing in the petition.

Opinion of the court 
The opinion of the presiding judge being that the said section was valid and constitutional, the application for the writ was denied, and the judgment entered upon the denial is brought to the high court for review.

Justice Stephen J. Field, delivered the opinion of the Court.

See also
List of United States Supreme Court cases, volume 113

References

External links
 

United States Supreme Court cases
United States Supreme Court cases of the Waite Court
1885 in United States case law
History of San Francisco
United States equal protection case law